Digby Dragon is a British preschool stop motion animated television series created by Sally Hunter, which aired from 4 July 2016 to 29 July 2019. It is produced in the UK by Blue Zoo Productions for Nick Jr.

Premise 
Digby is an anthropomorphised dragon who lives in the magical land of Applecross Wood, with a group of friends. These friends include creatures typically found in real-life forests, as well as a variety of magical trolls.

Cast 
 Clark Devlin as Digby Dragon, a young, green dragon "fledgling" who can't fly yet. 
 Ainsley Howard as Fizzy Izzy, a ditzy but lovable pink fairy, and Digby's best friend.
 Rasmus Hardiker as "Cheeky" Chips, a nut-obsessed red squirrel.  
 Dustin Demri-Burns as Grumpy Goblin, the cantankerous local inventor/engineer. Has three pet snails and a train called "Scottie".
 Lucy Montgomery as Grizel; a bad tempered little blue elf that likes causing mischief, and Archie; a little grey mouse and the local delivery girl. 
 Mark Heap as Mungo, a scatter-brained and clumsy owl, who serves as Grizel's sidekick.
 Clive Russell as Albert, a good-natured old badger that owns the Applecross grocery shop. 
Spellbook: Fizzy's "Be A Good Fairy Spellbook", who is a bossy, somewhat overbearing magical book. 
Sprite: A fun-loving creature that appears as a ball of golden sparkles. 
Muddles: A mud monster that lives in the Applecross Swamp.
Mushrooms: Three little mushrooms with faces that hop about the woods.

References

External links 

2016 British television series debuts
2019 British television series endings
2010s British children's television series
2010s British animated television series
British children's animated comedy television series
British children's animated fantasy television series
English-language television shows
Channel 5 (British TV channel) original programming
Nick Jr. original programming
Animated television series about dragons
Animated television series about squirrels
British preschool education television series
Animated preschool education television series
2010s preschool education television series